Tibor Ladányi (born 21 November 1991) is a Hungarian football player who currently plays for MTK Hungaria FC.

Club statistics

Updated to games played as of 1 June 2014.

External links
Profile at HLSZ 
Profile at MLSZ 

1991 births
Living people
Footballers from Budapest
Hungarian footballers
Association football midfielders
MTK Budapest FC players
Szigetszentmiklósi TK footballers
Budafoki LC footballers
FC Dabas footballers
Nemzeti Bajnokság I players
Expatriate footballers in Austria
Expatriate footballers in Germany
Hungarian expatriate sportspeople in Austria
Hungarian expatriate sportspeople in Germany